NBA ShootOut 2004 is a basketball video game developed by 989 Sports and published by Sony Computer Entertainment America for the PlayStation and PlayStation 2 in 2003. It is the final installment in the NBA ShootOut franchise. Tracy McGrady of the Orlando Magic is the cover athlete.

Reception

The PlayStation 2 version received "mixed" reviews according to the review aggregation website Metacritic.

References

External links
 

2003 video games
Basketball video games
North America-exclusive video games
PlayStation (console) games
PlayStation 2 games
Video games developed in the United States
Video games set in 2004
Video games set in the United States